Austin Shaba was one of the leaders of Tanganyika, later Tanzania, from the time the country won independence from Britain on 9 December 1961.

Shaba biography
He participated in the independence struggle and became a cabinet member in the first independence cabinet under Prime Minister Julius Nyerere, serving as minister of local government. Nyerere became president of Tanganyika on the country's first independence anniversary on 9 December 1962 and Shaba continued to be a cabinet member.

After Tanganyika united with Zanzibar on 26 April 1964 to form the United Republic of Tanganyika and Zanzibar, renamed the United Republic of Tanzania on 29 October 1964, Shaba continued to be a cabinet member in the new union government and served as minister of health and housing. He was also a member of parliament for Mtwara and served as deputy speaker of parliament in the 1980s.

He became even more well-known after it was learned that he held all those senior government positions and other posts when he was not a citizen of Tanganyika or Tanzania. He was born in Mzimba, Nyasaland which was renamed Malawi after independence, and moved to Tanganyika with his parents when he was a child. He grew up in Tanganyika and attended school in Tanganyika. He was also trained as a medical assistant at Tanganyika's national hospital in the nation's capital Dar es Salaam and worked at hospitals in Tanganyika.

After working as a medical assistant for sometime, he resigned and joined the independence struggle, becoming an active member of the Tanganyika African National Union (TANU), the party that led the country to independence.

After it was learned that he was not a citizen, he lost all his government positions and the other posts he held and eventually returned to his home country, Malawi, where he later died.

Other people
There were many people from Nyasaland who worked in Tanganyika during colonial rule and even after independence. Many of them worked in the government, mainly as a civil servants, and some of them held high positions even though they were not citizens. Some of them were even in the army.

Another cabinet member in the government of Tanganyika, later Tanzania, who also was not a citizen and came from Nyasaland like Austin Shaba, was Michael Kamaliza. He came from Likoma Island in Lake Nyasa.

Kamaliza was also a member of the first independence cabinet under Nyerere and served as minister of labour. He was still minister of labour when he was involved in a plot to overthrow the government. The coup was to take place in October 1969 when President Nyerere and a number of high-ranking government officials including cabinet members and the head of the Tanzania People's Defence Forces (TPDF), Major-General Mrisho Sarakikya, were out of the country.

The mastermind of the plot was Tanzania's former minister of foreign affairs, Oscar Kambona, who once was very close to President Nyerere. Kamaliza was convicted of treason, together with the other conspirators including Kambona who was not tried in absentia while living in self-imposed exile in Britain although prosecutors and intelligence officials said he was the ringleader. He secretly left Tanzania for Britain in July 1967 and masterminded the coup attempt from there.

Together with Austin Shaba, Michael Kamaliza was the only other cabinet member since independence who was not a citizen of Tanganyika, later Tanzania. And both came from the same country which was the homeland of many people who worked in Tanganyika, later Tanzania, in many capacities before and after independence. 

One of them was Kanyama Chiume who became Malawi's first minister of foreign affairs after the country won independence from Britain on 6 July 1964. He left Nyasaland in 1937 when he was about 7 years old after his mother died and went to live with his uncle who worked for the British colonial government in Morogoro, Tanganyika. He grew up in Tanganyika and went to school in Tanganyika. He lived in Tanganyika, later Tanzania,  for more than 50 years, longer than he did in Nyasaland (Malawi) before he returned to his home country in 1994. One of his classmates at a boarding school in Dar es Salaam was Rashidi Kawawa who later became prime minister and vice president of Tanganyika, later Tanzania. They also lived in the same dormitory at that school. Chiume also knew Nyerere for many years even before Nyerere led Tanganyika to independence and was close to him during all the years he lived in Tanganyika.

Another prominent non-citizen from Nyasaland who, like Austin Shaba and Michael Kamaliza, occupied a high position in Tanganyika was Captain Alex Donald Gwebe Nyirenda who became head of the army when the country won independence.

It was Captain Nyirenda who, on the eve of Tanganyika's independence, hoisted Tanganyika's flag and lit the independence (uhuru) torch on Africa's highest peak to symbolise the dawn of a new era and freedom from colonial rule.

References

Sources
Godfrey Mwakikagile, Nyerere and Africa: End of an Era, New Africa Press, Fifth Edition, Pretoria, South Africa, 2010. About Austin Shaba, see pp.  104, 105, 121, 377; about Michael Kamaliza, see pp. 104, 119, 365, 366, 369, 370, 371, 372, 702; about Kanyama Chiume, see pp. 80, 488.

Godfrey Mwakikagile, Growing up in a Border District and Resolving the Tanzania-Malawi Lake Dispute: Compromise and concessions, African Renaissance Press, 2022. 

See also about Kanyama Chiume:

Godfrey Mwakikagile: Eurocentric Africanist?
https://sites.google.com/site/intercontinentalbookcentre/godfrey-mwakikagile-a-eurocentric-pan-africanist

Godfrey Mwakikagile, Life under British Colonial Rule, New Africa Press, 2018. See about Austin Shaba, pp. 136, 137.

Year of birth missing
Possibly living people
Government ministers of Tanganyika
Government ministers of Tanzania
Tanzanian independence activists